James A. Burke (March 3, 1890 – September 12, 1965) was a Democratic politician from Queens, New York City and served as its borough president for eight years.

Burke was born in Brooklyn, New York in 1890 but was orphaned when he was 8 years old. After high school he took night classes at New York University while he worked. In 1914 he moved to Queens, where he became active in many civic organizations. During the first World War he worked as a civilian at the Brooklyn Navy Yard, eventually becoming superintendent of stock in charge of $60 million worth of supplies.

After the war, he had various jobs in purchasing and accounting. He had leadership positions in two Queens civic organizations. He was a member of the New York State Assembly (Queens Co., 4th D.) in 1931, 1932, 1933 and 1935. While there, he championed Queens issues, including the construction of the Grand Central Parkway.

In 1941, he won election as borough president of Queens, beating the Republican incumbent George U. Harvey. While in office, he focused on transportation and taxes in the borough. He won two terms to the office, and resigned in 1949. He did not seek any further political offices.

He died in his Little Neck, Queens, home in 1965.

References 

1890 births
1965 deaths
Queens borough presidents
Democratic Party members of the New York State Assembly
20th-century American politicians
People from Douglaston–Little Neck, Queens